This article discusses the responsibilities of the various agencies involved in combating corruption in New Zealand. New Zealand is regarded as having one of the lowest levels of corruption in the world.

Agencies

Serious Fraud Office 

The Serious Fraud Office (SFO) is the lead law enforcement agency for investigating and prosecuting serious financial crime, including bribery and corruption.
In 2020, the SFO reported that it had seen a 40 percent increase in cases involving public officials, central and local government, in the past five years.

Electoral Commission 

The Electoral Commission is responsible for the administration of parliamentary elections and promoting compliance with electoral laws, including those around the size and transparency of donations. If they believe the law is being broken, they refer the matter to the Police or Serious Fraud Office.

Independent Police Conduct Authority 

The Independent Police Conduct Authority is an independent body that considers complaints against New Zealand Police and oversees their conduct. Under section 12 of the Independent Police Conduct Authority Act 1988, "the Authority's functions are to: receive complaints alleging misconduct or neglect of duty by any member of Police or concerning any Police practice, policy or procedure affecting a complainant; and to investigate incidents in which a member of Police (acting in the execution of his or her duty) causes or appears to have caused death or serious bodily harm."

Ombudsman 

The Ombudsman's role is to ensure citizens receive 'fair play' in their dealings with government entities, and they investigate where required. Over the years the powers of the Office have been extended to include education and hospital boards (from 1968), local government agencies (1975), requests under the Official Information Act (2003) and in 2005, all crown entities.

Conventions
New Zealand has ratified several important international anti-corruption conventions such as the OECD Convention on Combating Bribery of Foreign Public Officials in International Business Transactions and the United Nations Convention against Corruption.

International ranking
New Zealand is regarded as having one of the lowest levels of corruption in the world. Transparency International's Corruption Perceptions Index scores 180 countries according to the perceived corruption of the public sector and then ranks those countries by their score. A high score earns a low ranking, and signals a perception of an honest public sector. In the 2022 Index, New Zealand earned the second highest score of the 180 countries (87 out of 100 possible). For comparison, the worst score was 12 (ranked 180).

See also
 Crime in New Zealand
 Finance company collapses, 2006–2012 (New Zealand)
 Taito Phillip Field

References

Further reading

External links
Bribery and corruption page at the Serious Fraud Office
Transparency International New Zealand

 
New Zealand
Crime in New Zealand by type